Imma catapsesta is a moth in the family Immidae. It was described by Edward Meyrick in 1934. It is found on the Marquesas Islands in French Polynesia.

References

Moths described in 1934
Immidae
Moths of Oceania